Longworth Powers (1835–1904) was an American photographer and sculptor, active in Florence, Italy.

Powers was born in Cincinnati, Ohio as the eldest son of sculptor Hiram Powers. He spent one semester at the United States Military Academy at West Point, after which he was asked to leave, and then attended Rensselaer Polytechnic Institute without obtaining a degree. After his family moved to Florence in 1835, Powers worked as a bookkeeper in his father's studio and learned the sculptor's craft. He returned to America for some years but in 1860 returned to Florence as a photographer and sculptor. He died in Florence.

Notes

References 

Smithsonian American Art Museum biography

American photographers
American sculptors
1835 births
1904 deaths
Artists from Cincinnati
Sculptors from Ohio
20th-century American sculptors
21st-century American sculptors
American emigrants to Italy